The Caretaker Cabinet of Ioannis Grivas was the Cabinet of the government of Greece for the period 12 October–23 November 1989. It was sworn in on 12 October 1989 when the government of Tzannis Tzannetakis completed its work. The outgoing chairman of the Court of Cassation, Ioannis Grivas formed a caretaker government, which conducted the Greek legislative election, November 1989. This election resulted in a hung parliament, and the Ecumenical Cabinet of Xenophon Zolotas which formed on 23 November 1989.

Ministers

See also

Cabinets of Greece
1980s in Greek politics
1989 in Greece
1989 establishments in Greece
1989 disestablishments in Greece
Cabinets established in 1989
Cabinets disestablished in 1989